Unexplained Fevers is a book of poetry that was written by Jeannine Hall Gailey and published by New Binary Press in 2013. This collection, Gailey's third, deals again with issues that affect contemporary women, such as body image, illness, and how to deal with the limiting social norms and expectations of women. Familiar Grimms fairy tale characters make repeated appearances in this collection, including The Snow Queen, Rapunzel, Red Riding Hood, Snow White and Rose Red. Although the characters are classic, the point of view and tone of this book is both modern and universal. The poem "She Had Unexplained Fevers" from the collection was featured on Verse Daily.

Awards
Won second place in the  2014 Elgin Awards for full-length poetry books published in 2013; presented by the Science Fiction Poetry Association (SFPA).

Reviews
Critical reviews of Unexplained Fevers have appeared in the following literary publications:
 Amazing Stories
 Escape Into Life
 The Huffington Post UK Edition
 Library Journal
 The Pedestal Magazine
 The Rumpus
 Savvy Verse & Wit
 Wild Goose Poetry Review

References

External links
 New Binary Press Web site
 Jeannine Hall Gailey's Web site 

American poetry collections
2013 poetry books